Macrofossils, also known as megafossils, are preserved organic remains large enough to be visible without a microscope. The term macrofossil stands in opposition to the term microfossil. Microfossils, by contrast, require substantial magnification for evaluation by fossil-hunters or professional paleontologists. As a result, most fossils observed in the field and most "museum-quality" specimens are macrofossils.

Varieties

Plant macrofossils

Plant macrofossils include leaf, needle, cone, and stem debris; and can be used to identify types of plants formerly growing in the area. Such botanical macrofossil data provide a valuable complement to pollen and faunal data that can be used to reconstruct the prehistoric terrestrial environment.  Algal macrofossils (for instance, brown kelp, sea lettuce and large  stromatolites) are increasingly used to analyze prehistoric marine and aquatic ecosystems.

Animal macrofossils

Animal macrofossils include the teeth, skulls, and bones of vertebrates, as well as such invertebrate remains as shells, tests, faunal armor, and exoskeletons.  Fossilized dung (that is, coprolites) are also macrofossils.

Image gallery

References

Fossils